The Latin Grammy Award for Best Ranchero Album was an honor presented annually at the Latin Grammy Awards, a ceremony that recognizes excellence and creates a wider awareness of cultural diversity and contributions of Latin recording artists in the United States and internationally. The award went to solo artists, duos, or groups for releasing vocal or instrumental albums containing at least 51% of new recordings in the ranchero music genre.

Vicente Fernández is the most awarded performer in this category having won eight times include once for three consecutive years from 2002 to 2004 and once for four consecutive years from 2008 to 2011. He is also the most nominated artist in the category with fifteen nominations Pepe Aguilar is the second most awarded performer with four wins.

The award has been presented mostly by artists originating from Mexico in all but three occasions. In 2005 when it was awarded to Puerto Rican singer Luis Miguel, who happens to reside in Mexico, in 2005 for the album México En La Piel and the following two years to an American singer of Mexican origin Pepe Aguilar.

In 2016, the award not awarded due to a lack of entries. All-female band Flor de Toloache won the award in 2017, becoming the first female recipients of the award as well as the first band to win.

Winners and nominees

2000s

2010s

2020s

 Each year is linked to the article about the Latin Grammy Awards held that year.

See also
Latin Grammy Award for Best Regional Song

References

General
  Note: User must select the "Regional Field" category as the genre under the search feature.

Specific

External links
Official site of the Latin Grammy Awards

 
Mariachi albums
Ranchera albums
Ranchero Mariachi Album
Ranchero Mariachi Album